Eduardo Westerdahl (Santa Cruz de Tenerife, Canary Islands, 1902 - ibidem, 1983) was a Spanish painter, art critic and writer, and a member of the Surrealist Movement.

Biographical notes 
Westerdahl was born of a Catalan mother and Swedish father. 
His formal education was in business management and he earned his living as a bank employee.

His private interests in philosophy and arts led him to establish the publication Iletras y Pajaritas de Papel and was editor in chief of the art revue Gaceta del arte (est 1932) which was at the lead among European art and culture magazines.

Though he greatly contributed to several important publications, the single deed that gave him most notoriety is the establishment of The Contemporary Art Museum Eduardo Westerdahl in Puerto de la Cruz (Canary Islands) which is considered to be one of the most important museums for contemporary Spanish art.

Works
Poemas de sol lleno (1928), poetry
Will Faber (1957), art criticism 
Óscar Domínguez (1968) y (1971), art criticism

External links 
Biography of..(Spanish)
Wikipedia..(Spanish)

1902 births
1983 deaths
Spanish photographers
20th-century Spanish painters
20th-century Spanish male artists
Spanish male painters
People from Santa Cruz de Tenerife
Spanish people of Swedish descent
Writers from the Canary Islands
Artists from the Canary Islands
20th-century Spanish poets
Spanish male poets
20th-century Spanish male writers